The 1956–57 Liga Leumit season lasted from December 1956 until April 1957. Hapoel Tel Aviv won the title, the club's first championship since independence in 1949.

No clubs were relegated as the league was expanded from ten to twelve clubs for the following season. The top five clubs from Liga Alef entered the promotion play-offs, resulting in Hapoel Kfar Saba and Hapoel Jerusalem being promoted.

Final table

Results

Promotion play-offs
Due to irregularities during the 1956–57 Liga Alef season, an IFA committee decided to hold a promotion play-off between the top five clubs in Liga Alef at the end of the season. Each team played the other four once at a neutral venue. The top two clubs were to be promoted and the third would play a promotion/relegation play-off against Maccabi Jaffa.

Matches were played initially during September, but Maccabi Rehovot, who had finished the season in the second place and had expected to be promoted, declined to participate and appealed the committee's decision. The results of Rehovot's matches were initially recorded as 0-3 technical losses. However, after their appeal was rejected, the club were allowed to replay their matches.

Hapoel Kfar Saba and Hapoel Jerusalem were promoted to Liga Leumit. Hapoel Hadera and Hakoah Tel Aviv were due to play a deciding match to set who will play against Maccabi Jaffa, but Hapoel Hadera declined to participate in protest at the IFA's decision to allow Maccabi Rehovot to replay their games.

Promotion and relegation play-offs

References
Israel - List of Final Tables RSSSF

Liga Leumit seasons
Israel
1956–57 in Israeli football leagues